Qilu University of Technology (shortened in QLU) is a public university in Jinan, Shandong province, China. It was founded in 1948 as the Jiaodong Industry School. In 2013, its name was changed to "Qilu University of Technology" from "Shandong Institute of Light Industry", and In 2017, it was combined with Shandong Academy of Sciences. The main campus of the university is located in the Western University Science Park in the Changqing District of Jinan, and the branch campuses are located in Heze City and Qingdao City.

Key labs and disciplines

Schools and departments

The School of Chemistry and Chemical Engineering 

The School of Chemistry and Chemical Engineering (SCCE) is one of the initial founded faculty in Qilu University of Technology. In nowadays, it includes five different subjects, which are: Chemistry, Chemical Engineering, Applied Chemistry, Pharmaceutic Preparation and Energetic Engineering. The SCCE has about 150 lecturers and researchers, including 22 professors, 46 associate professors. The students are subordinated in Jinan and Heze campus and in total there are 2400 bachelor students and over 200 master students.

The School of Chemistry and Chemical Engineering attaches great importance to the international education and cooperation. It has been worked close with international universities closely in the field of education and academic research. In 2012, the first international class, which is under the subject of Applied Chemistry, has been found. The international class was firstly cooperated with Saimaa University of Applied Sciences in Finland and then transferred to Tampere University of Applied Sciences. Most of the graduate students have successfully applied for the master/Ph.D. degree programs in Finland, Sweden, Denmark, the US and so on.

History

References

External links
 Qilu University of Technology website 
 Qilu University of Technology website 
 Archives of Qilu University of Technology 

Universities and colleges in Jinan
Technical universities and colleges in China
Educational institutions established in 1948
1948 establishments in China